CHMB is a Canadian AM radio station, broadcasting from Vancouver, British Columbia on 1320 kHz. The station airs a Chinese language programming format. CHMB's studios are located on Commerce Parkway in Richmond, while its transmitters are located on Lulu Island in Richmond.

CHMB and CJMR are the only stations in Canada which broadcast on 1320 AM.

CHMB is owned and operated by Mainstream Broadcasting Corporation, a British Columbia media company owned and operated by Vancouver businessman James Ho. Mainstream began broadcasting in 1973 as Overseas Chinese Voice (OCV). In 1993, OCV programming was incorporated into the multicultural AM radio station of CHMB AM 1320, which broadcasts to Vancouver's multicultural community.

CHMB broadcasts to Vancouver's Chinese-speaking community, and in 12 other languages: Portuguese, Brazilian, Filipino, Greek, Japanese, Tamil, Ukrainian, Vietnamese, Danish, Icelandic, Norwegian and Swedish.

History
CHMB began as an English-language station that was called CHQM. It signed on the air on December 10, 1959, as an easy listening station under the ownership of Vancouver Broadcast Associates Ltd. with 10 kW of power. CHQM's sister station, CHQM-FM, first aired on August 10, 1960 as a simulcast of the AM station, airing 19 hours a day. CHQM and CHQM-FM went to 24-hour broadcasting on September 1, 1962.

In November 1966, CHQM increased its transmission power to 50 kW. On August 23, 1969, corporate parent Vancouver Broadcast Associates changed its name to Q Broadcasting Ltd. Jack Stark, who had co-founded the company with Bill Bellman, became the sole owner in 1979. In September 1984, CHQM began airing the "Music of Your Life" format from 6 p.m. to midnight daily while retaining its main easy listening format for the balance of its broadcast day.

On January 1, 1990, CHQM dropped its longtime easy listening format for an adult contemporary format and began using the on-air brand Lite 1320. CHQM and CHQM-FM were purchased by CHUM Limited on October 17 that year, but due to Canadian Radio-Television and Telecommunications Commission (CRTC) regulations of the time (which allowed ownership of only one AM and one FM station in the same market), CHUM had to sell either CHQM or its other Vancouver AM outlet, CFUN; CHUM chose to sell CHQM.

On February 20, 1991, CHQM switched formats again to adult standards of the 1930s to the 1960s with the new station brand Q 1320. The station began airing Chinese-language programming on January 23, 1993, from 10:30 p.m. to 6 a.m. daily, then moved the start time for Chinese shows to 9 p.m. three weeks later. On December 14, 1993, the CRTC approved CHUM's sale of CHQM to Mainstream Broadcasting Corporation.

On February 9, 1994 (on which the Chinese New Year fell that year), CHQM signed off for the final time at 9 p.m. with Bob Hope's "Thanks for the Memories" as the farewell song, and was replaced moments later by CHMB. Original station co-owner Jack Stark died on October 30, 2001, at age 83.

Programming
CHMB's programming is primarily Chinese (Overseas Chinese Voice) (Cantonese & Mandarin), aired from Monday to Friday, with some Brazilian, Danish, Filipino, Greek, Icelandic, Japanese, Norwegian, Swedish, Tamil, Ukrainian and Vietnamese programming on weekends.

Awards
Mainstream Broadcasting Corp., CHMB AM 1320 winner of the
2015 Jack Webster Award - Best Reporting Chinese Language.

References

External links
 AM1320 CHMB
 
 

Chinese-Canadian culture in Vancouver
Hmb
Richmond, British Columbia
Chinese-language mass media in Canada
Hmb
Radio stations established in 1959
1959 establishments in British Columbia
Jack Webster award recipients